Pazarköy (literally "market village") is a place name in Turkish and may refer to:
 Pazarköy, Bolu, a town in Bolu Province, Turkey
 Pazarkoy, Ezine, a village in Ezine district of Çanakkale Province, Turkey
 Pazarköy, Yenice,  a town in Yenice district of Çanakkale Province, Turkey

See also
 Pazar (disambiguation)
 Pazarcık
 Pazaryeri